Artur Barseghyan (born 29 March 2002) is an Armenian swimmer. He competed in the men's 50 metre freestyle event at the 2018 FINA World Swimming Championships (25 m), in Hangzhou, China.

References

External links
 

2002 births
Living people
Armenian male freestyle swimmers
Swimmers at the 2018 Summer Youth Olympics
Swimmers at the 2020 Summer Olympics
Olympic swimmers of Armenia